Gegian or (Gagian-گیگیاں) is a village northeast of Gujrat City, Punjab, Pakistan, on the banks of Khalsi-Naala river.

History 
Gegian was founded by the Kshatriya clan, predominantly Gurjar or Gujjar tribes who became Muslims in the 17th century during the reign of Aurangzeb. The word Gagian was derived from the Gaigi sub-caste of Gujjar clan. It was populated by two major sub-castes namely Barkatt (Bargatt) and Gaigis. Other Gotras of Gujjar tribe live in Gagian, including Chaechi, Khatana, Thikri and Chauhans. The entire population practices Islamic faith and express relatively tolerant religious views closely related to traditional Sufi culture.

Shrine 
The shrine of Sufi saint Baba Saeen Chirag Badshah is located in Gagian. Saint Baba Sher Ghazi, now buried in Chakori Sher Ghazi in Tehsil Kharian, originally belonged to Gagian.

Economy 
The primary occupation is agriculture, attracting many settlers.

Notables 

Muhammad Asghar (late) (President Pakistan Wrestling Federation)

References 

Villages in Gujrat District